Husów  is a village in the administrative district of Gmina Markowa, within Łańcut County, Subcarpathian Voivodeship, in south-eastern Poland.

The village has a population of 2,000.

See also
 Walddeutsche

References

Villages in Łańcut County